Kenneth "Supreme" McGriff (born September 19, 1960) is an American convicted former drug lord and gangster from New York City.

Background
McGriff rose to prominence in early 1981 when he formed his own crack cocaine distributing and manufacturing organization which he called The Supreme Team based in the Baisley Park Houses in the South Jamaica section of the Queens borough of New York City, New York. Under McGriff's leadership, the gang's numbers swelled to the hundreds and came to control the crack cocaine trade in Baisley Park, the neighborhood where McGriff was raised. In 1987, McGriff was arrested following a joint state and federal investigation and in 1989 pleaded guilty to engaging in a Continuing Criminal Enterprise. He was sentenced to 12 years incarceration. McGriff was released from prison on parole in early 1994 after serving approximately five years of his sentence. He was sent back to prison on parole violations by year's end, and served another 2½ years before being released in 1997.

Friendship with Murder Inc.
After being released from prison on parole in 1994, McGriff tried his hand at cinematography, seeking help from Irv Gotti to film a movie based on the Kenyatta series' novel Crime Partners. However, due to McGriff's reputation, the FBI soon questioned the intimacies of the affiliation with Murder Inc., culminating in a raid of the Murder Inc. offices in early 2003. McGriff faced accusations of drug trafficking while others with Murder Inc. were indicted on money laundering and conspiracy to commit money laundering charges.

Other criminal activities
McGriff is alleged to have had a hand in the 2002 murder of Run-DMC member Jam Master Jay, and was convicted of ordering the 2001 death of rapper Eric "E-Moneybags" Smith, in retaliation for the death of McGriff's friend Colbert "Black Just" Johnson. Federal authorities also accused him in connection with the attempted murder of 50 Cent.

On February 1, 2007, McGriff was convicted of murder-for-hire at a federal court in the Eastern District of New York on charges that he paid $50,000 to have two rivals (Eric "E-Moneybags" Smith and "Big Nose" Troy Singleton) killed in 2001. The jury deliberated for five days before finding McGriff guilty of murder conspiracy and drug trafficking. On February 9, 2007, McGriff was sentenced to life in prison. Throughout this case he was defended by a court-appointed attorney because nearly all of his assets had been seized. 

McGriff began serving his life sentence at ADX Florence, a federal supermax prison in Colorado. In 2011, he was transferred to the United States Penitentiary, Lee, a high-security federal prison in Pennington Gap, Virginia. , he is housed at USP McCreary in Pine Knot, Kentucky.

See also
List of crime bosses convicted in the 21st century

References

 

1960 births
Living people
Gang members
American crime bosses
African-American gangsters
American gangsters
Criminals from Queens, New York
American drug traffickers
Gangsters from New York City
Gangsters sentenced to life imprisonment
Inmates of ADX Florence
21st-century African-American people
20th-century African-American people